Bovlstrup or Boulstrup is a village in Jutland, Denmark. It is located in Odder Municipality of the Central Denmark Region, near the Bay of Aarhus.

History
Early in its history, Borvlstrup contained a warehouse and a customs post.

Bovlstrup Station opened near the village in 1884, as a stop on the Hads-Ning Hundreds' Railroad, connecting Bovlstrup to Hou, Odder and Aarhus. When the Hou-Odder stretch was shut down in 1977, the station in Bovlstrup was shut down as well.

References

Odder Municipality
Cities and towns in the Central Denmark Region
Villages in Denmark